Arroyo Barril is a municipal district of Santa Bárbara de Samaná, Samaná Province in the Dominican Republic. It is on the south coast of the Samaná Peninsula, on the coast of Samaná Bay.

It was elevated to the category of municipal district on May 1, 2003.

Climate

Population
In the last national census (2002), the population of Arroyo Barril was included with that of Santa Bárbara de Samaná.

Economy
The most important economic activities of Arroyo Barril are the same as the province as a whole: agriculture, fishing and tourism.

References

Populated places in Samaná Province